Gnathogastrura is a genus of springtails in the family Hypogastruridae. There is at least one described species in Gnathogastrura, G. paramoensis.

References

Further reading

 
 
 

Poduromorpha
Springtail genera